The 2009 Volkswagen Challenger was a professional tennis tournament played on carpet courts. It was part of the 2009 ATP Challenger Tour. It took place in Wolfsburg, Germany between 23 and 29 February 2009.

Singles main-draw entrants

Seeds

 Rankings are as of February 16, 2009.

Other entrants
The following players received wildcards into the singles main draw:
  Richard Becker
  Jaan-Frederik Brunken
  Florian Mayer
  Louk Sorensen

The following players received entry from the qualifying draw:
  Ruben Bemelmans
  Dustin Brown
  Pierre-Ludovic Duclos
  Farrukh Dustov

Champions

Men's singles

 Ruben Bemelmans def.  Stefano Galvani, 7–6(5), 3–6, 6–3

Men's doubles

 Travis Rettenmaier /  Ken Skupski def.  Sergei Bubka /  Alexander Kudryavtsev, 6–3, 6–4

Volkswagen Challenger
2009 in German tennis
Volkswagen Challenger